Canarium olydium is a species of sea snail, a marine gastropod mollusc in the family Strombidae, the true conchs.

Description

Distribution

References

 Chenu, 1844 Parts 26-27. In Illustrations Conchyliologiques ou description et figures de toutes les coquilles connues vivantes et fossiles, classées suivant le système de Lamarck modifié d'après les progrès de la science et comprenant les genres nouveaux et les espèces récemment découvertes, p. Strombus pp 1-8 ; Spondylus pl 28, 29 ; Pecten pl 2, 8, 3, 4, 44-6 ; Cassis pl 2 ; Vermetus pl; 4 ; Dentalium pl 7
 Liverani V. (2014) The superfamily Stromboidea. Addenda and corrigenda. In: G.T. Poppe, K. Groh & C. Renker (eds), A conchological iconography. pp. 1-54, pls 131-164. Harxheim: Conchbooks.

Strombidae
Gastropods described in 1844